Maria Cristina de 'Medici (24 August 1609 – 9 August 1632) was a Tuscan princess and the first born child of Cosimo II de' Medici, Grand Duke of Tuscany.

Biography 
Maria Cristina de 'Medici was born on 24 August 1609 in Florence as the first child of Cosimo II de' Medici, Grand Duke of Tuscany and Archduchess Maria Maddalena of Austria. She was born with a deformity and was possibly mentally disabled. She was baptized in the Catholic faith on 21 November 1610.

In 1619 she was sent to live in the Convent of the Holy Conception run by the Order of St. Stephen.

She died on 9 August 1632 at the Villa del Poggio Imperiale.

References 

1609 births
1632 deaths
House of Medici
Tuscan princesses
Burials at San Lorenzo, Florence
Daughters of monarchs